Muhammed Zunaid Nanabhay (born 11 January 1967) is a former South African cricket umpire. He stood in one ODI game in 2002.

See also
 List of One Day International cricket umpires

References

1967 births
Living people
South African One Day International cricket umpires
People from Potchefstroom